Front of Followers of the Line of the Imam and the Leader, formerly known as Islamic Aligned Organizations is a Coalition of Iranian Principlist political groups. The group which consists of a wide range of traditional conservative parties, is active since administration of Mohammad Khatami, and is aligned with The Two Societies.

The coalition was the main conservative electoral list for the 2000 Iranian legislative election, but became part of United Front of Conservatives' list for the 2008 and 2012 legislative elections.

They endorsed 31 candidates for the City Council of Tehran in the 2013 Iranian local elections,  only Abbas Sheybani was able to win a seat.

Parties 
The members of the coalition include:
 Islamic Coalition Party: secretary-general Asadollah Badamchian
 Islamic Society of Engineers: secretary-general Mohammad-Reza Bahonar
 Islamic Society of Majlis sessions representatives: secretary-general Mohsen Kouhkan
 Islamic Society of Students
 Islamic Society of Academics
 Islamic Association of Physicians of Iran: secretary-general Hossein-Ali Shahriari
 Islamic Society of Employees: secretary-general Kamal Sajjadi
 Islamic Society of Athletes: secretary-general Hassan Ghafourifard
 Islamic Society of Workers
 Islamic Society of Educators
 Zeinab Society
 Association of Graduates of Indian Subcontinent: secretary-general Manouchehr Mottaki
 Union of Islamic Associations of Guilds and Bazaaris

Leaders

References 

Political party alliances in Iran
Principlist political groups in Iran
Electoral lists for Iranian legislative election, 1996
Electoral lists for Iranian legislative election, 2000